Ibri College of Technology is a college located at Ibri in Oman. It is one of 7 Technical colleges managed and run by the Ministry of Manpower in Oman. The college accepted its first intake in September 2007 with 347 students all in the foundation program. The college has three academic departments (Information Technology, Business Studies and Engineering) and two centers( English Language Center and Educational Technologies Center). The total number of students enrolled in the college is around 2400 students.

References

Colleges in Oman